Hamed Heidari or Abdollah Heidari Til is an iranian-born Paralympian athlete competing mainly in category Javelin Throw - F57 events who represented Iran until 2017 after which he has represented the Republic of Azerbaijan.

Biography 
Hamed Heidari was born in Ardabil in Azerbijani family. He was injured during wartime and has limb deficiency. He took up Para athletics in 2009. His international debut was in 2015 in United Arab Emirates when he represented Iran. He won a silver medal in the F57 javelin throw at the 2016 Summer Paralympics in Rio de Janeiro. In 2017 he won a bronze medal in the F57 javelin throw at the 2017 World Para Athletics Championships at London.

In 2021 Heidari won a silver medal for Azerbaijan at the 2021 World Para Athletics European Championships at Bydgoszcz in the F57 javelin throw with the throw of 43.49 meters. At the 2020 Summer Paralympics at Tokyo Hamed Heidari representing Azerbaijan won a gold medal in the F57 javelin throw with a world record throw of 51.42 meters, breaking the previous record of Amanolah Papi from Iran (49.56) which was set in the same session moments ago.

References

Paralympic athletes of Iran
Athletes (track and field) at the 2016 Summer Paralympics
Paralympic silver medalists for Iran
Paralympic gold medalists for Azerbaijan
Living people
Medalists at the 2016 Summer Paralympics
Paralympic medalists in athletics (track and field)
1991 births
Azerbaijani javelin throwers
Iranian male javelin throwers
People from Ardabil Province